Gustav Ernest Viktor Lundgren (born 18 September 1980 in Stockholm, Sweden) is a Swedish jazz guitarist.

Biography 
Lundgren started playing the guitar at the age of thirteen and went to Södra Latin's music program during high school. He then studied music at Bollnäs folk high school and Fridhems folk high school in Svalöv.

After finishing his studies, he joined the Hot Club de Suede and started a jazz club at Hannas Krog at Södermalm in Stockholm.

He participates in several music projects, including his own Gustav Lundgren Quartet, and plays a particular Spanish-inspired jazz.

He runs his own record company, Lundgren Music.

Honors 
 2004: Honored with his own signature guitar model from AJL-Guitars
 2005: Recipient of the Louis Armstrong Scholarship
 2009: Honored with a grant from The Swedish Arts Grants Committee

Discography

Solo albums 
 2004: First Impression (Lundgren Music), with Gustav Lundgren Quartet/Quintet
 2007: Second Opinion (Lundgren Music), with Gustav Lundgren Quartet
 2010: 8 Venues (Lundgren Music), with Gustav Lundgren Quartet
 2012: Plays Django Reinhardt (Lundgren Music)
 2014: French Connection (Lundgren Music)
 2015: Bertheleville (Lundgren Music), with Gustav Lundgren Trio
 2017: At The Movies (Lundgren Music), with Gustav Lundgren & Unit

Collaborations 
 2002: 29m² (SJR), with Mozaique
 2003: Avec (SJR), with Hot Club de Suede
 2005: Django Project vol. 1 (Lundgren Music), with Anders Larsson
 2008: Django Project vol. 2 (Lundgren Music), with Anders Larsson
 2011: Take Two (Lundgren Music), with Stockholm Swing All Stars
 2012: Janeiro (Lundgren Music), with Daniel Santiago
 2012: Barcelona / Estocolmo (Lundgren Music), with Fredrik Carlquist
 2013: Plays Richard Rodgers (Lundgren Music), with Trio Legacy
 2013: Bossa Nova vol. 1 (Lundgren Music), with Fredrik Carlquist 
 2014: Passageiros (Lundgren Music), with Lili Araujo
 2014: Cruce de Caminos (Lundgren Music), with Celia Mur
 2015 : Mar (Lundgren Music), with Luiz Murá
 2017: Jazz Vol. 1 (Lundgren Music), with Jorge Rossy and Doug Weiss
 2017: Acoustic Connection LIVE (Lundgren Music), with Antoine Boyer

References

External links
 
 Lundgren Music website

Swedish jazz guitarists
Male jazz musicians
1980 births
Living people
21st-century guitarists